The 1980 Paris–Nice was the 38th edition of the Paris–Nice cycle race and was held from 5 March to 12 March 1980. The race started in Issy-les-Moulineaux and finished at the Col d'Èze. The race was won by Gilbert Duclos-Lassalle of the Peugeot team.

General classification

References

1980
1980 in road cycling
1980 in French sport
March 1980 sports events in Europe
1980 Super Prestige Pernod